Repe may refer to:

People
 Jurij Repe (born 1994), Slovenian ice hockey player
 Repe or Reino Helismaa (1913–1965), Finnish singer-songwriter, musician and scriptwriter

Places
 Repe (river), North Rhine-Westphalia, Germany